Elytrostachys is a genus of bamboo (tribe Bambuseae of the family Poaceae),  found in the rainforests from Honduras to Venezuela.

Species
 Elytrostachys clavigera McClure - Costa Rica, Honduras, Nicaragua, Panamá, Colombia
 Elytrostachys typica McClure - Honduras, Colombia, Venezuela

References

Bambusoideae genera
Bambusoideae
Taxa named by Floyd Alonzo McClure